Eltham College is a private day school situated in Mottingham, southeast London. Eltham and Mottingham once formed part of the same parish, hence its name. It is a member of The Headmasters' and Headmistresses' Conference (HMC).

Early history
The school dates back to the early Victorian era, when it was founded as the London Missionary Society's School for the Sons and Orphans of Missionaries. Within a short time the Baptist Missionary Society joined as co-founders.  A girls' school had been established in Walthamstow in 1838 and a boys' school was opened in the same place at the beginning of 1842. The boys' school later relocated to Mornington Crescent in 1852 and then to a purpose-built location in the centre of Blackheath in 1857 (the building, directly adjacent to Blackheath Station, later became the headquarters of the Church Army and is now a private hospital). Missionary David Livingstone sent his son Robert to the school during the 1850s.

Current site
The school moved to its present site - centred on an 18th-century mansion (Fairy Hall) in Mottingham - in 1912. The building had previously been used by the Royal Naval School from 1889 to the end of the summer term in 1910.

Eltham College began life as a small boarding school catering for children of missionaries serving overseas, mainly in India, China and Africa. From 1945 to 1976 Eltham was a Direct Grant school; thus, for example, the 1952 intake was roughly 20 pupils from London County Council schools and 20 from Kent schools (all 40 of these on scholarships), and 20 fee-payers. When the Direct Grant system was abolished in 1976, the school chose to go fully independent. After the 1950s the number of missionary sons fell sharply and the school became primarily a day school for boys until it went fully co-educational in the 2020s. The sixth form has admitted girls since 1978.  Reflecting the origins of the school, each of the four houses is named after a prominent LMS or BMS missionary, namely Carey, Livingstone, Chalmers and Moffat; coloured blue, green, red and yellow respectively.

21st century developments
Headmaster (2000-2014) Paul Henderson continued a programme of building and development started by Christopher Waller, including major refurbishments to the junior school and music school, and a car park in front of the college. The Gerald Moore Art Gallery (partly funded by and named after artist Gerald Moore, an Old Elthamian) opened in 2012, displaying works by Moore, students and other artists.
 
Also in 2012, to mark the centenary of the move to Mottingham, the college launched a campaign to raise the funds to replace the Sixth Form Centre and Jubilee Block. Construction began in July 2017 and ended in February 2019. The new Turberville building (named after Geoffrey Turberville, the college's longest serving headmaster, 1930–1959) is located on the west side of the Old Quad with a new colonnade linking it to existing buildings. A triple-height, glazed atrium forms a link between the quad and the playing fields to the east and gives access to the David Robins Sixth Form Centre.

Girls were admitted to Year 3 and Year 7 for the first time in autumn 2020 (since the late 1970s girls have been members of the sixth form).  Thus Eltham College will be fully co-educational in every year from autumn 2024.

Sexual abuse allegations
As of June 2021, a newspaper article reported that former students who had collected testimonials about alleged incidents between 2016 and 2021 received letters from the school's solicitors requesting them to desist, or provide evidence. The school said: “Safeguarding remains our top priority, and we want to do everything we can to make our pupils feel safe and fully supported. We have very strong pastoral procedures and reporting systems in place, and these are kept under regular review to ensure they remain fully fit for purpose".

Alleged malpractice in teacher-assessed grades
In February 2022, the Sunday Times investigated possible malpractice in teacher-assessed grades given to pupils at private schools in 2021. These replaced the formal exams that were cancelled due to the COVID-19 pandemic. For Eltham College, in 2021 72.2% of its A-level entries got A* grades, whereas in 2019 the figure was only 29.1%. In 2022, the figure was still impressive, but lower at 44%.

Headmasters

Blackheath
The school's headmasters at Blackheath were:
1852-1866: William George Lemon
1866-1868: James Scott
1869-1870: Charles Dugard Makepeace
1870-1875: Edward J Chinnock
1875-1892: Edward Waite
1893-1914: Walter Brainerd Hayward (he brought the school to Mottingham in 1912)

Mottingham

1914-1926: George Robertson
1926-1930: Nevil Wood
1930-1959: Geoffrey Turberville
1959-1983: Christopher Porteous
1983-1990: Christopher Waller
1990-2000: Malcolm Green
2000–2014: Paul Henderson
2014–present: Guy Sanderson

Notable Old Elthamians

(in alphabetical order)
Sir John Adams, physicist, director of CERN
 Sir John Bailey, Procurator General and Treasury Solicitor
 Philip Bailey, cricket statistician
 Stuart Ball, political historian 
 George Band, mountaineer
 Nicholas Barberis, professor of Finance
 Piers Benn, philosopher
 Andrew Percy Bennett, diplomat
 Sir Anthony Bottoms, criminologist
 Fenner Brockway, peace campaigner
 Tony Brise, racing driver
 Sir Michael Buckley, civil servant
 Nabil Al Busaidi, adventurer
 Charlie Connelly, author and broadcaster
 Stephen Dunnett, neuroscientist, and Professor of Biosciences since 2005 at Cardiff University
 Mike Exeter, grammy winning sound engineer and producer
 Ernest Fahmy, obstetrician and gynaecologist
 Frank Farmer, physicist
 Stephen Farr, organist
 Nick Ferrari, radio broadcaster
 Freddie Foster, cricketer
 Simon Gass KCMG CVO, Senior Diplomat, Ambassador to Iran 2009-11, and to Greece from 2004-9
 Barry Hammett, Royal Navy chaplain
 Brian Harris (priest)
 James Harris, Welsh rugby union player
 Richard Hart, cricketer
 Christopher Idle, Anglican priest and hymn writer
 David E. H. Jones, chemist and writer
 Jim Knight, former Labour MP, Minister of State for Schools in the UK Government, MP from 2001-2010 for South Dorset
 Barnaby Lenon, headmaster of Harrow School and academic
 Eric Liddell, Olympic athlete, after whom the sports hall is named
 Peter Luff, campaigner
 Johan Malcolm, Leicestershire county cricket player
 Alan Martin, Professor of Theoretical Physics
 Gerald Moore, surgeon and artist
 Adrian Nance, Royal Navy officer
 Jack Oliver, weightlifter
 Phil Packer MBE, soldier and fundraiser
 Mervyn Peake, author of Gormenghast, after whom the library is named
 Thomas Ernest Pearce, sportsman and member of the Legislative Council of Hong Kong
 Geoffrey K. Pullum, Professor of General Linguistics since 2007 at the University of Edinburgh
 David Sanger, organist
 Michael Saward, Anglican priest and hymn writer
 Andrew Sentance, Member of the Bank of England Monetary Policy Committee from 2006–11, and Chief Economist of British Airways from 1998-2006 
 Gerald Summers, furniture designer
 Bryan Sykes, human geneticist and genealogist
 Alan Wolstencroft, Archdeacon of Manchester

Arms

References and sources

Eltham College website
Independent Schools Inspectorate, containing a report on the College
Old Elthamians RFC website

1842 establishments in England
Educational institutions established in 1842
Private boys' schools in London
Private co-educational schools in London
Private schools in the London Borough of Bromley
Member schools of the Headmasters' and Headmistresses' Conference